Zöhrabkənd (also, Zakhrabkend and Zokhrabkend) is a village in the Davachi Rayon of Azerbaijan.  The village forms part of the municipality of Çuxurazəmi.

References 

Populated places in Shabran District